Knife Pleat is a French restaurant run by chef Tony Esnault and his wife and restaurateur Yassmin Sarmadi  in Costa Mesa, California.

Esnault and Sarmadi are best known for creating Los Angeles restaurants Spring and Church & State

Knife Pleat is located in the penthouse of South Coast Plaza and seats approximately 80 people in two dining areas.

In 2021, the restaurant was awarded one Michelin star.

See also 

 List of French restaurants

References

External links
 

Michelin Guide starred restaurants in California
2019 establishments in California
Restaurants in Orange County, California
Restaurants in California
Fine dining
French restaurants in California